The 1972 New England Patriots season was the franchise's third season in the National Football League and 13th overall. The Patriots ended the season with a record of three wins and eleven losses and finished last in the AFC East Division. The Patriots continued their period of futility as they slumped to another horrendous record, and missed the playoffs for the ninth straight season. After being embarrassed 31–7 in their home opener against Cincinnati, the Patriots would win their next two games against Atlanta and Washington. However, the Patriots would continue their mid-season misery, losing nine consecutive games to slide to 2–10 before winning their first (and only) road game against the New Orleans Saints. New England went winless against AFC opponents. Out of their 11 losses, only two were by one possession, a 24–17 loss to Baltimore and a 27–24 loss to Buffalo. The worst of these losses was a 52–0 thrashing by the eventual Super Bowl champions, the Miami Dolphins, who would go on to achieve the only undefeated season in NFL history. That Dolphins loss remains the worst loss and most points ever allowed in a game in Patriots history.

Although they won three games, the 1972 Patriots had the second-worst point differential (minus-254) of any team in a 14-game NFL season, ahead of only the expansion 1976 Buccaneers. The 1972 Patriots had the franchise’s worst point differential until the 1990 team was outscored by 265 points (181–446) in a 1–15 season. They lost eight of their fourteen games by three touchdowns or more, and their first two wins were by a single point. Pro Football Reference argues that the 1970 and 1972 Patriots were, owing to the more difficult schedule faced by the 1990 team, the weakest Patriot teams ever, and rivalled only by the 1991 Colts and 2009 Rams as the weakest team by an established franchise since the NFL–AFL merger.

Draft

Staff

Roster

Regular season

Schedule

Game summaries

Week 1 vs Bengals

Week 3 vs Redskins

Standings

References 

New England Patriots
New England Patriots seasons
New England Patriots
Sports competitions in Foxborough, Massachusetts